Buncle is a Celtic derived surname originating from Bonkyll Castle, Berwickshire, Scotland. It has many modern variations that are phonetically similar, for example: Bonkle, Bonkyll, Bonkill, Bonkylle, Bonkile, Bunkle, Bunkall and Bonckle. The names' meaning is believed to refer to a chapel at the bottom of hill.

See also 
Bonkyl Kirk
Bonkle

References 
The Buncle Story

External links 
Bunkle, Duns and the origin of the name
 Some Buncle history
Bonkle, Lanarkshire website
Buncle tartan
Buncle tartan as designed by Olivier Fuchs of Buncle and Preston

Surnames of British Isles origin